WeRobotics is a not-for-profit organization that uses drones for humanitarian purposes.

In 2018, responding to a Zika outbreak, the organization released 284,2000 sterile mosquitoes in Brazil.

The organization has also worked in Peru, Papua New Guinea, Nepal, and Tanzania delivering medical products and mapping disaster zones to aid humanitarian response.

Organization 
WeRobotics was co-founded in December 2015 by Patrick Meier and Andrew Schroeder, and has offices in Wilmington and Geneva.

WeRobotics works with local communities to create innovation laboratories, called Flying Labs, to assess if technology solutions may address local problems.

Activities 

WeRobotics is piloting healthcare deliveries in Peru, with a focus on rapid deployment of snakebite-antivenom. 

In Papua New Guinea, in partnership with Red Wing Labs, WeRobotics does work for the U.S. Centre for Disease Control.

In Nepal, WeRobotics has created the Katmandu Flying Lab and uses drones to create maps. Flying Labs are also running in Tanzania and Peru.

WeRobotics worked with the Red Cross in Fiji to map damage to buildings caused by Cyclone Keni. 

In March 2018, in collaboration with the Insect Pest Control Laboratory of the International Atomic Energy Agency and during a Zika virus outbreak, WeRobotics introduced 284,200 sterile male mosquitoes around Carnaíba do Sertão, Brazil, interrupting the reproductive behavior of the fertile mosquitoes.

WeRobotics ran a process to update the Unmanned Aerial Vehicle Code of Conduct in May 2018.

In 2021, the company released a children's picture book called Ariel & Friends about the use of drones for social good.

See also 

 Patrick Meier, co-founder

References

External links 

 Official website

 Humanitarian UAV Network

Organisations based in Geneva
Robotics organizations
Humanitarian aid organizations
Humanitarian aid organizations in Europe
2015 establishments
Non-governmental organizations